Halo is the debut album of guitarist and composer Andy Hawkins, issued under the moniker Azonic. It was released on July 1, 1994 by Strata Records. Marking a departure from his work with Blind Idiot God, the album comprises four lengthy improvised guitar drones accompanied by electronics. Hawkins described the music as "violent ambiance, harnessing the resonant frequencies of the void to take you out of the here and now."

Critical reception 

In writing for Allmusic, critic Brian Olewnick praised Hawkins' passionate and inventive playing style, saying "Hawkins manages to wring some tasty juice from an area, post-Hendrix rock guitar, that most would have considered long since dry." In 2006, The Wire described Halo as "a criminally overlooked post-Metal masterpiece" and called Hawkins "a master of oceanic reverb and sustain, turning riffs from concrete slabs to gentle, body-caressing ripples."

Track listing

Personnel 
Adapted from the Halo liner notes.

Musicians
Andy Hawkins – guitar, musical arrangements
Gabriel Katz – effects, bass guitar

Production and additional personnel
Oz Fritz – engineering
Bill Laswell – production, musical arrangements
Layng Martine – assistant engineer
Alex Winter – photography, design

Release history

References

External links 
 

1994 debut albums
Albums produced by Bill Laswell
Azonic albums
Strata (record label) albums